Wantzosaurus was a genus of temnospondyl amphibian of the Trematosauridae family. Fossils have been found in the Early Triassic Middle Sakamena Formation (Sakamena Group) of what is now Madagascar. It showed adaptations for an almost completely aquatic lifestyle, having the ability to swim by lateral undulation. A pelagic lifestyle for this animal has been proposed.

References 

Lonchorhynchines
Triassic temnospondyls of Africa
Early Triassic amphibians of Africa
Induan life
Fossils of Madagascar
Fossil taxa described in 1961